Ascophyllum nodosum is a large, common cold water seaweed or brown alga (Phaeophyceae) in the family Fucaceae, being the only species in the genus Ascophyllum. It is a seaweed that grows only in the northern Atlantic Ocean, also known in localities as feamainn bhuí, rockweed, Norwegian kelp, knotted kelp, knotted wrack or egg wrack. It is common on the north-western coast of Europe (from the White Sea to Portugal) including east Greenland and the north-eastern coast of North America, its range further south of these latitudes being limited by warmer ocean waters.

Description
Ascophyllum nodosum has long tough and leathery fronds, irregularly dichotomously branched fronds with large, egg-shaped air bladders set in series at regular intervals along the fronds and not stalked. The fronds can reach 2 m in length and are attached by a holdfast to rocks and boulders. The fronds are olive-green, olive-brown in color and somewhat compressed, but without a midrib.

Reproduction
Its life history is of one diploid plant and gametes. Each individual plant is either male or female. The gametes are produced in the spring in conceptacles embedded in yellowish receptacles on short branches.

Varieties and forms
Several different varieties and forms of this species have been described.
 Ascophyllum nodosum var. minor has been described from Larne Lough in Northern Ireland.

Free-floating forms of this species are found in, for example, A. n. mackaii Cotton, which is found at very sheltered locations, such as at the heads of sea lochs in Scotland and Ireland.

Ecology
Ascophyllum nodosum is found mostly on sheltered sites on shores in the midlittoral, where it can become the dominant species in the littoral zone.

The species is found in a range of coastal habitats from sheltered estuaries to moderately exposed coasts, and often it dominates the intertidal zone (although subtidal populations are known to exist in very clear waters). However, it is rarely found on exposed shores, and if it is found, the fronds are usually small and badly scratched.
This seaweed grows quite slowly, 0.5% per day, carrying capacity is about 40 kg wet weight per square meter, and it may live for 10–15 years. It may typically overlap in distribution with Fucus vesiculosus and Fucus serratus. Its distribution is also limited by  salinity, wave exposure, temperature, desiccation, and general stress. It may take approximately five years before becoming fertile.

Phlorotannins in A. nodosum act as chemical defenses against the marine herbivorous snail, Littorina littorea.

Polysiphonia lanosa (L.) T.A. Christensen is a small red alga, commonly found growing in dense tufts on Ascophyllum whose rhizoids penetrate the host. It is considered by some as parasitic; however, as it only receives structural support from knotted wrack (not parasitically), it acts as an epiphyte.

Distribution

This species has been recorded in Europe from Ireland, the White Sea, the Faroe Islands, Norway, Britain and Isle of Man, Netherlands, and North America from the Bay of Fundy, Nova Scotia, Baffin Island, Hudson Strait, Labrador, and Newfoundland. It has been recorded as an accidental introduction near San Francisco, California, and eradicated as a potential invasive species.

Uses
Ascophyllum nodosum is harvested for use in alginates, fertilisers, and the manufacture of seaweed meal for animal and human consumption. It has long been used as an organic and mainstream fertilizer for many varieties of crops due to its combination of both macronutrients, (N, P, and K) and micronutrients (Ca, Mg, S, Mn, Cu, Fe, Zn, etc.). It also contains cytokinins, auxin-like gibberellins, betaines, mannitol,  organic acids, polysaccharides, amino acids, and proteins which are all very beneficial and widely used in agriculture. 
Ireland, Scotland and Norway have provided the world's principal alginate supply.

Ascophyllum nodosum is frequently used as packaging material for baitworm and lobster shipments from New England to various domestic and international locations. Ascophyllum itself has occasionally been introduced to California, and several species frequently found in baitworm shipments, including Carcinus maenas and Littorina saxatilis, may have been introduced to the San Francisco Bay region this way.

Toxicological uses 
Because the age of the different parts of  A. nodosum can be identified by its shoots, it has also been used to monitor concentrations of heavy metals in seawater. A concentration factor for zinc has been reported to be of the order 104.

Chemistry 
Ascophyllum nodosum contains the phlorotannins tetraphlorethol C and tetrafucol A.

Harvesting controversy
Controversy exists over impacts of commercial harvesting of A. nodosum for use in garden or crop fertilizers and livestock feed supplements in North America and Europe. Some research has been focused on bycatch and impact on intertidal zone communities.

Opponents of its wild harvest point to the algae's high habitat value for over 100 marine species, including benthic invertebrates,
 commercially important fish, wild ducks, shorebirds, and seabirds. Shoreland owners in Maine, as well as federal, state, and local agencies in the United States, have placed their conservation lands off limits to rockweed removal. Rockweed harvesters point to the value of the seasonal jobs created by the harvest operation, and also highlight the differences in impact of different harvesting methods such as machine v hand harvesting.

References
This article incorporates CC BY-2.5 text from the reference

External links

Fucales genera
Edible seaweeds
Monotypic brown algae genera
Taxa named by John Stackhouse
Fucaceae